Palpita pudicalis is a species of moth of the family Crambidae. It was described by George Hamilton Kenrick in 1907 and is found in Papua New Guinea.

It has a wingspan of 30 mm.

References

External links
"Taxonomy Browser: Palpita pudicalis". BoldSystems. with an image

Moths described in 1907
Palpita
Moths of New Guinea